The Europe/Africa Zone was one of three groups of Davis Cup competition in 2004.

Group I

Group II

Egypt, Denmark, Tunisia, and Ireland relegated to Group III in 2005.
Italy and Serbia and Montenegro promoted to Group I in 2005.

Group III

Venue 1
Venue: Orange Tennis Centre, Kaunas, Lithuania (indoor carpet)
Date: 2–8 February

(scores in italics carried over)

Monaco and Estonia promoted to Group II in 2005.
Cyprus and Andorra relegated to Group IV in 2005.

Venue 2
Venue: National Tennis Stadium, Windhoek, Namibia (hard)
Date: 12–16 May

(scores in italics carried over)

Côte d'Ivoire and Ghana promoted to Group II in 2005.
Kenya and Madagascar relegated to Group IV in 2005.

Group IV

Venue 1
Venue: Olympique Club de Dakar, Dakar, Senegal (hard)
Date: 2–8 February

Nigeria and San Marino promoted to Group III in 2005.

Venue 2
Venue: Tennis Club Ali-Ten, Chişinău, Moldova (clay)
Date: 12–18 July

(scores in italics carried over)

Bosnia and Herzegovina and Armenia promoted to Group III in 2005.

See also
Davis Cup structure

 
Europe Africa
Davis Cup Europe/Africa Zone